Whiskers Point Provincial Park is a provincial park in British Columbia, Canada and is located beside McLeod Lake approximately 20 km south of the community of McLeod Lake.

While primarily focused on recreational opportunities, Whiskers Point Provincial Park also provides significant conservation value as it is 1 of only 5 protected areas in McGregor Plateau ecosystem, all of which all small. Whiskers Point contributes 2.24% of the overall representation of this ecosection.

Recreation
The park's location beside the lake allows access to swimming, windsurfing, waterskiing, boating and fishing. There is also lakeside hiking, picnicking, and camping.

References 

Regional District of Fraser-Fort George
Provincial parks of British Columbia
1956 establishments in British Columbia
Protected areas established in 1956